The 2001 FIBA Oceania Championship for Women was the 9th edition of the basketball tournament. The tournament featured a two-game series between Australia and New Zealand. Games one and two were held in Invercargill and Christchurch, New Zealand.

Results

References

2001 in basketball
basket
International basketball competitions hosted by New Zealand
FIBA Oceania Championship for Women
2001 in Oceanian sport
2001–02 in Australian basketball